Phikkal or Fikkal may refer to
Phikkal Rural Municipality, a rural municipality in Sindhuli District, Bagmati Province, Nepal
Phikkal Bazar, a settlement in Suryodaya Municipality, Province No. 1, Nepal